Sorry and the Sinatras are a punk rock-influenced hard rock band based in both Philadelphia, Pennsylvania and London, United Kingdom, formed in 2007. Since 2010, the band has been composed of Scott Sorry (The Wildhearts, formerly of Amen and Brides of Destruction), Dave Kerr (formerly of The Cherrykicks), Rich Jones (The Loyalties) and Lenny Thomas (formerly of Trashlight Vision). Previously the group featured Danny Sinatra (formerly of Blackbelt) and Roger "Rags" Segal (formerly of Trashlight Vision).

To date, Sorry and the Sinatras have released one album, Highball Roller (2009), and a six-song EP Kings of Shambles Street (2012).

History

Early years, Formation (2005–2007)
Sorry met Segal and Thomas in North Carolina while Sorry was on tour with his previous band Brides of Destruction in 2005. Roger and Lenny were both in Brides support act Trashlight Vision. Sorry started working on new material with Blackbelt guitarist Danny Sinatra when Trashlight Vision split up. Roger and Lenny then linked up with Sorry and Danny to form a new group. Initially the band was named The Sad Eyed Sinatras by Sorry before it was rechristened Sorry and the Sinatras by guitarist Danny in 2007. Danny Sinatra left the group on March 24, 2008 stating on his Myspace blog that stress, health, and family issues were his reason for leaving but that he left the band on good terms. Dave Kerr formerly of The Cherrykicks was added as his replacement with the official lineup consisting of Sorry on lead vocals and rhythm guitar, Dave on lead guitar, Roger on bass and Lenny on drums.

Highball Roller (2008–present)
On May 7, 2008, while touring the United States, the band posted on their Myspace that they signed a deal with UnderGroove Records and a release date for their debut album would be made by the end of 2008. They announced, in June, their first dates in the UK in August, taking place at The Asylum in Birmingham and at the Bar Academy in London. The group entered the studio in September in Barnsley, UK with producer Jason Sanderson.  The album was completed in less than 3 weeks. Highball Roller was released May 11, 2009, which was generally well received by British music critics, with a tour of the UK planned but this was postponed until October with the band touring the East Coast of the US in August.

On February 2, 2010, new guitarist Rich Jones, who replaced bassist Roger Segal with Scott Sorry taken up the bass, announced the group were to tour the UK in April. On February 25, via Twitter, the group announced they had completed songs for a six-song EP.

Discography
Highball Roller (2009)
The Kings Of Shambles Street E.P. (2012)

Band members

Current lineup
Scott Sorry – vocals, bass
Dave Kerr – guitar, backing vocals
Rich Jones – guitar
Lenny Thomas – drums

Former members
Danny Sinatra – guitar, backing vocals
Roger "Rags" Segal – bass, backing vocals (died February 2022)

References

External links
 

Musical groups established in 2007
Hard rock musical groups from Pennsylvania
Punk rock groups from Pennsylvania
Supergroups (music)
Musical groups from Philadelphia
Musical groups from London